Brad Calip (born December 12, 1962) is a former American football player. He played professionally as defensive back and wide receiver with the Denver Gold of the United States Football League (USFL) and the Pittsburgh Gladiators / Tampa Bay Storm and Cincinnati Rockers of the Arena Football League (AFL). Calip played college football as a quarterback at East Central University in Ada, Oklahoma. He was inducted into the College Football Hall of Fame in 2003.

References

External links
 

1962 births
Living people
American football defensive backs
American football quarterbacks
American football wide receivers
Alabama Crimson Tide football players
Cincinnati Rockers players
Denver Gold players
East Central Tigers football players
Pittsburgh Gladiators players
Tampa Bay Storm players
College Football Hall of Fame inductees
People from Hobart, Oklahoma
Players of American football from Oklahoma